Drumcree may refer to:

Events
the Drumcree conflict

Places in Northern Ireland
Drumcree, a parish in County Armagh
Drumcree, a townland in Drumcree parish
Drumcree Church, a church in Drumcree parish
Drumcree College, a school in Drumcree parish

Places in the Republic of Ireland
Drumcree, County Westmeath